Billy Syahputra (born 16 January 1991) is an Indonesian actor, presenter, and comedian. Syahputra had garnered fame for appeared on the Trans TV television show Yuk Keep Smile.

Career
Syahputra began his career in the world of entertainment when he replaced his brother, Olga Syahputra, who had to be absent from shooting a television show due to illness. Syahputra has appeared in several comedy television shows, such as Opera Van Java on Trans 7, Yuk Keep Smile on Trans TV, Pesbukers on ANTV, and Dahsyat on RCTI. In 2013, Syahputra began his debut film for played in the horror-comedy film Taman Lawang which had starred with his brother Olga.

During his career, Syahputra had winning several awards in entertainment, such as the "Outstanding Guest Host" award at the 2014 Dahsyatnya Awards, and was also nominated in the "Outstanding Couple" category. He also winning for "Most Exciting Newcomer" award at the 2014 Global Seru Awards and "Favorite Newcomer Celebrity" award at the 2014 Insert Awards, which successful beating to Aliando Syarief and Cita Citata, while the category "Most Exciting Newcomer", the other nominees were Fatin Shidqia, Jenita Janet, Syahnaz Sadiqah, and Ahmad Dhani's son, Al Ghazali.

In 2016, Syahputra had auditioned to dangdut singing competition in Indosiar D'Academy Celebrity and was eliminated in Top 5.

Personal life
He is the fourth out of seven children of Nur Rachman and Nurshida. His brother Olga Syahputra was also a presenter, actor, and comedian. Olga died from meningitis on 27 March 2015.

Filmography

Film

Television

Made for TV

Discography

Single

Video clips

Awards and nominations

References

External links
 Berita di Kapanlagi

1991 births
Living people
Javanese people
Minangkabau people
Indonesian actors
Male actors from Jakarta
Indonesian television presenters
Indonesian male comedians
Indonesian comedians